Nikola Gajić (born 23 April 1998) is a Serbian footballer.

Club career

Vojvodina
On 25 April 2018 Gajić made his debut for Vojvodina, in 2–1 away loss to Voždovac.

Loan to Cement
After the first unsuccessful 6-month-loan in Cement which ended with injury, Gajić got another chance to prove his talent in August 2017 with another loan. He scored 9 goals and had 5 assists in 15 games what recommended him to the first team of Vojvodina.

Extremadura
On 4 August 2019 Gajić a four-year-deal with Spanish side Extremadura.

International career
Gajić was called in Serbia U17 national team squad during the 2015. He made his debut for the under-21 team in a friendly against the Macedonia U21s in November 2018.

Career statistics

References

External links
 
 

1998 births
Living people
Association football forwards
Serbian footballers
Serbian expatriate footballers
FK Vojvodina players
FK Cement Beočin players
Extremadura UD footballers
OFK Bačka players
FK Kabel players
Serbian SuperLiga players
Footballers from Novi Sad
Serbian expatriate sportspeople in Spain
Expatriate footballers in Spain